The Royal Air Force Benevolent Fund (RAF Benevolent Fund or RAFBF) is the Royal Air Force's leading welfare charity, providing financial, practical and emotional support to serving and former members of the RAF – regardless of rank – as well as their partners and dependents.

They help members of the RAF family deal with a wide range of issues: from childcare and relationship difficulties to injury and disability, and from financial hardship and debt to illness and bereavement.  Any member of the RAF family can approach the fund for help, which includes serving and former members of the RAF, their partners and dependents.

History

Lord Trenchard founded the Royal Air Force Benevolent Fund in 1919, one year after the formation of the Royal Air Force. In their first year, welfare expenditure was £919. The first welfare assistance they gave was a shilling for a night's lodging to give the recipient a chance to seek work. Other early assistance included money to provide a beneficiary with tools of his trade and the repair of a pair of working boots. In 2010 the RAFBF spent over £23 million on welfare provision.

The Royal Air Force Benevolent Fund was originally known as the Royal Air Force Memorial Fund as one of their charitable objects was to raise a memorial to airmen who died in the First World War. The Royal Air Force Memorial was completed in 1923. The monument, in Portland stone surmounted by a gilded eagle, can be seen on Victoria Embankment.

Fundraising for the RAF Benevolent Fund occurred outside the UK as well. Prior to the United States entering World War II, Piper Aircraft Company produced 49, one for each state in the US plus another, Piper J-3 aircraft with RAF insignia and nicknamed the Flitfire, to be auctioned to benefit the RAFBF. On 29 April 1941 all 48 aircraft flew into La Guardia Field for a dedication and fundraising event which included Royal Navy officers from the battleship HMS Malaya, in New York for repairs, as honored guests.

The RAFBF was awarded a Royal Charter in 1999 and this was updated in 2008 by the addition of a new charitable object to permit them to work towards supporting the morale and well-being of the serving RAF.

See also 
 SSAFA Forces Help
 Royal Air Forces Association
 The Royal British Legion

References

External links 
 

British veterans' organisations
Buildings and structures in Marylebone
Organisations based in the City of Westminster
Organizations established in 1919
Organisations based in the United Kingdom with royal patronage
Royal Air Force
1919 establishments in the United Kingdom